The 1991 LEN European Sprint Swimming Championships were the first edition of what later would become the European Short Course Championships. It was held in Gelsenkirchen, Germany from 6–8 December 1991, and was organised by the Ligue Européenne de Natation. Only the 50 m events of each stroke, 100 m individual medley and 4×50 m relay events were at stake at this inaugural edition.

Medal table

Results summary

Men's events

Women's events

References
Results on GBRAthletics.com

E
S
1991
International aquatics competitions hosted by Germany
Swimming competitions in Germany
Sports competitions in Gelsenkirchen
1990s in North Rhine-Westphalia
20th century in Gelsenkirchen
European Sprint Swimming Championships